Pembroke Dock railway station serves the town of Pembroke Dock in Pembrokeshire, Wales.

History

In 1872, the GWR converted all of its lines in the area to standard gauge.

Originally, the station had two platforms. Both remain but only the southern one is in use (the track serving the other has now been removed). Part of the main building has been converted into The Station Inn, a real ale pub. Originally carrying munitions, the freight branch ran past the station across local streets down to the actual dockside until 1969. Subsequently, albeit partially, the track has been lifted. Coal trains to Pembroke Dock ran until the end oft 1978. The twice-weekly service had become uneconomic: in 1969, almost 800 wagons carrying over 10,000 tons of coal had been carried, compared with only 218 wagons with 3,500 tonnes of coal in the first nine months of 1978.

In 2020, the Grade II listed building was regenerated as part of the £24 million Wales Station Improvement Scheme, which saw the restoration of the station canopies while keeping the historic design and character of the station.

Facilities
Transport for Wales Rail is the operator; the station is unstaffed; ticket machine is installed; CIS displays provide train running information in addition to the standard timetable poster boards and public telephone. The station canopies remain to provide a covered waiting area with bench seating. There are no waiting rooms. Level access is available from the car park and at the main entrance to the platform.

Services

Connections are available at Swansea for mainline destinations at other times. Trains run every two hours Mon-Sat, with a less frequent service on Sundays.

On summer Saturdays, the station is served by Great Western Railway who provide two trains to London Paddington. One train arrives from London Paddington and one train starts in the morning at Swansea. The service is named as the Pembroke Coast Express and until 2019, it was operated by InterCity 125 HST sets which have now been replaced by new Class 800 trains.

References

External links 

Railway stations in Pembrokeshire
DfT Category F1 stations
Former Great Western Railway stations
Railway stations in Great Britain opened in 1864
Railway stations served by Transport for Wales Rail
Railway stations served by Great Western Railway
Railway stations serving harbours and ports in the United Kingdom
railway station